Joshua Holt Hamilton (born May 21, 1981) is an American former professional baseball player. A five-time All-Star player, Hamilton won three Silver Slugger Awards and was named the American League (AL) Most Valuable Player (MVP) in 2010. He also won an AL batting championship along with an AL RBI title. During his major league tenure, he also played for the Cincinnati Reds and the Los Angeles Angels of Anaheim. 

Hamilton was the first overall pick in the 1999 MLB draft by the Tampa Bay Devil Rays. He was considered a blue chip prospect until injuries sustained in a 2001 car accident and a drug addiction derailed his career beginning in 2001. Prior to the 2007 season, Hamilton was selected by the Chicago Cubs in the Rule 5 draft, but was traded to the Cincinnati Reds. Prior to the 2008 season, he was traded to the Rangers. In 2012, Hamilton received more votes than any other player on the All-Star Game ballot, besting by approximately 3.5 million votes the vote count set in 2011 by José Bautista. On May 8, 2012, Hamilton became the 16th player in MLB history to hit four home runs in a game. All four home runs were two-run home runs, and he set an AL record for total bases in a game with 18. Regarded as one of the best Rangers players of all time and pivotal to their back-to-back World Series appearances, the only ones in Rangers history, Hamilton was inducted into the Texas Rangers Hall of Fame in 2019.

Despite Hamilton's initial status as a model for overcoming drug addiction in sports, he experienced frequent relapses throughout his career, contributing to the decision to cut him from the Angels. He retired from baseball in 2015 following multiple knee injuries, having played in MLB for nine seasons. In 2019, four years following his retirement, Hamilton was charged with physically assaulting his daughter.

Early life
Hamilton, of majority Scottish heritage, was born and raised in Raleigh, North Carolina, playing little league baseball alongside former South Carolina and Oakland Athletics catcher Landon Powell. Hamilton attended Athens Drive High School in Raleigh where he starred as both a pitcher and outfielder. After hitting .529 in 25 games with 13 home runs, 20 stolen bases, 35 runs batted in (RBIs), and 34 runs scored, Hamilton was widely considered one of the top two prospects for the 1999 MLB draft, along with Josh Beckett, a Texas high school athlete. Hamilton initially signed a letter of intent to play college baseball for North Carolina State.

Professional career

Draft and minor leagues
The Tampa Bay Devil Rays owned the number one pick and selected Hamilton with the first overall selection. Hamilton signed with Tampa Bay, receiving a $3.96 million signing bonus, and joined their minor league system. His first stop in the minors was the rookie level Princeton Devil Rays of the Appalachian League, where he played 56 games. Hamilton later joined the Short Season Single-A club, the Hudson Valley Renegades, and helped lead them to their first New York–Penn League championship. He spent the  season with the Charleston RiverDogs in the South Atlantic League. Hamilton enjoyed a breakout season during which he hit .301 in 96 games, with 13 home runs and 61 RBIs. He was also selected to the South Atlantic League All Star game and took home MVP honors after going 2–6 with two triples and two runs scored. In addition, Hamilton was named to the 2000 All-Star Futures Game, a game designed to showcase minor league prospects. Hamilton was also voted Minor League Player of the Year by USA Today. At the start of his pro career, Hamilton's parents quit their jobs so they could travel with their son.
 
Prior to the  season, Hamilton was involved in an automobile accident. His mother and father were also injured but recovered. The 2001 season marked the beginning of Hamilton's drug and alcohol use, and he made his first attempt at rehabilitation. Hamilton only played 45 games in the 2001 season, split between the Charleston (Single-A) and the Orlando Rays, a Double-A team in the Southern League. Hamilton began the  season with the Bakersfield Blaze, batting .303 with nine home runs and 44 RBIs in 56 games before his season came to an end due to lingering toe and neck injuries. The Devil Rays noticed a change in Hamilton and reacted by sending him to the Betty Ford Center for drug rehabilitation.
 
During spring training of the 2003 season, Hamilton failed his first drug test. At the start of the season, Hamilton showed up late several times during spring training and was reassigned to the team's minor league camp. He left the team and resurfaced several times, but eventually took the rest of the season off for personal reasons. A "failed" test is one in which there is a positive result for a drug more severe than marijuana. A month later, MLB suspended him for the entire season after he failed two more tests.
 
Hamilton was out of baseball for almost three years. He made several attempts at rehabilitation, and started off the  season with hopes of being a star major league outfielder. However, he was arrested before the season for smashing the windshield of a friend's truck. The Rays placed Hamilton on the restricted list, moving him off the 40-man roster. After another relapse, MLB suspended him for the entire 2006 season.

During the days of his most prolific abuse, Hamilton met a businessman named Michael Chadwick, who made an attempt to steer him in the right direction. It was through this relationship Hamilton ended up meeting his wife, Katie, who was Chadwick's daughter. Hamilton's return to baseball was helped along by former minor league outfielder and manager Roy Silver, who owned a baseball academy in Florida. After hearing about Hamilton's desire to return to baseball, Silver offered the use of his facility if Hamilton agreed to work there. Hamilton first started working at Silver's Academy in January 2006. His duties included cleaning the bathrooms and raking the infield. Hamilton spent his nights sleeping on an air mattress in one of the facility's offices. After several months there, Hamilton attempted to play with an independent minor league team, but MLB stepped in and disallowed it.
  
Hamilton was allowed to work out with the Devil Rays' minor league players starting on June 2, 2006. By the end of the month, he was allowed to participate in minor league games. In order for this to happen, the Rays had to run Hamilton through waivers, making him available for any team for $20,000. No team put a claim in for him. Hamilton played in 15 games with the Hudson Valley Renegades at the end of the 2006 season, his second stint with the minor league ball club.

Rule 5 draft
Left off the Rays' 40-man roster, Hamilton was selected third overall in the 2006 Rule 5 draft by the Chicago Cubs, who immediately traded him to the Reds for $100,000 ($50,000 for his rights, and $50,000 to cover the cost of the Rule 5 selection). In their coverage of the draft, Chris Kline and John Manuel of Baseball America called Hamilton "the biggest name in the Rule 5 in many years".

Cincinnati Reds (2007)

Hamilton was one of the Reds' best hitters in spring training in 2007, leaving camp with a .403 batting average. In order to retain the rights to Hamilton, though, the Reds would have to keep him on their Major League 25-man roster for the entire 2007 season, so they planned to use him as a fourth outfielder. 
 
Hamilton made his Major League debut at the age of 26 on April 2 against the Chicago Cubs in a pinch-hit appearance, receiving a 22-second standing ovation. As he was waiting to bat, Cubs catcher Michael Barrett said, "You deserve it, Josh. Take it all in, brother. I'm happy for you." After he lined out, Hamilton stayed in the game to play left field. He made his first start on April 10 against the Arizona Diamondbacks, batting leadoff. In that game, he recorded his first Major League hit, a home run off Édgar González. The next night, he hit another. Hamilton was named the National League Rookie of the Month for April.
 
On May 22, the Reds placed Hamilton on the 15-day disabled list with gastroenteritis; they activated him on June 5 after he batted .333 (8-for-24) with four home runs and six RBIs in a six-game Minor League rehabilitation assignment. Hamilton went back on the DL on July 12 with a sprained wrist.
 
Hamilton ended up starting most of the season in center field after an injury to Ryan Freel, but was shut out in the voting for the Rookie of the Year, which was won by Ryan Braun. On December 21, 2007, the Reds traded Hamilton to the Texas Rangers for Edinson Vólquez and Danny Herrera.

Texas Rangers (2008–2012)

2008

In , Hamilton locked up the Rangers' starting center fielder job with a stellar spring training. His spring training performance continued into the regular season. Hamilton, usually slotted fourth in the Texas batting order, led all major league players in RBIs for the month of April. He was named AL Player of the Month after hitting .330 with 32 RBIs during the month. Hamilton then went on to win player of the month for the second straight month in May, becoming the first AL player in baseball history to be awarded Player of the Month for the first two months of the season. Hamilton was featured on the cover of the June 2, 2008, issue of Sports Illustrated, in a story chronicling his comeback. On July 9, Hamilton hit the first walk-off home run of his career, against Francisco Rodríguez.
 
Fans selected Hamilton as one of the starting outfielders for the AL at the 2008 Major League Baseball All-Star Game at Yankee Stadium. He finished first in voting among outfielders. He was one of seven first-time starters in the game. Along with Kosuke Fukudome, Geovany Soto, and Ryan Braun, Hamilton was one of four who had made their MLB debut in 2007 or 2008. He was selected to participate in the 2008 Major League Baseball Home Run Derby the evening before the game. Hamilton selected 71-year-old Clay Council to throw to him during the Derby. Council was a volunteer who threw batting practice for him as a child in Raleigh, North Carolina. In the first round of the event Hamilton hit 28 home runs, breaking the single-round record of 24 set by Bobby Abreu in 2005. Hamilton ended up hitting the most total home runs in the contest with 35, but lost in the final round to Justin Morneau, as the scores were reset. His longest home run was 518 feet. In 2006, when Hamilton was trying to get back into baseball, he had a dream in which he participated in a Home Run Derby at Yankee Stadium, but he could not remember how many home runs he had hit. After the Derby, Hamilton said: "This was like living the dream out, because like I've said, I didn't know the ending to that dream."
 
On August 17, Hamilton was intentionally walked with the bases loaded against the Rays in the bottom of the ninth, with the Rays leading 7–3, to bring Marlon Byrd to the plate. The Rays went on to win the game 7–4. Hamilton thus became the sixth player in history, and the first American League player in 107 years, to receive an intentional walk with the bases loaded. Joe Maddon said after the game, "We didn't want Hamilton to hit a home run. He's got 28, and Marlon Byrd's got 8." Hamilton finished seventh in the balloting for AL MVP, behind Dustin Pedroia, Justin Morneau, Kevin Youkilis, Joe Mauer, Carlos Quentin, and Francisco Rodríguez.

2009
In spring training, Hamilton led all players in RBIs, with 27, and total bases, with 59, in 81 at-bats. He hit a  home run into the right field home run porch off Angels reliever Shane Loux in the bottom of the eighth inning on May 15 in Arlington. Then, in the same series against the Angels, Hamilton leaped at the wall in center field and slammed into it, robbing Howie Kendrick of a possible home run.
 
Hamilton spent a portion of 2009 on the disabled list, with a bruised rib cage and an abdominal strain. After visiting doctors in Philadelphia on June 8, 2009, they found a slight abdominal tear, and he underwent a successful surgical operation to repair it the next day. He was expected to be out 4–6 weeks.
 
Though injured, he was selected by fan voting to play in the 2009 All-Star game, where he was joined by teammates Michael Young and Nelson Cruz. Hamilton finished batting .268 with 10 home runs and 54 RBIs in 2009.

A story that brought some controversy emerged when it was revealed Hamilton had gotten drunk in an Arizona bar earlier in the year. Hamilton subsequently apologized about the lapse.

2010: MVP season

In 2010, Hamilton was moved to left field to put young outfielder Julio Borbon in center field. As in his prior two seasons with the Rangers, Hamilton was again selected to start in the 2010 All-Star Game, as one of six members of the Rangers to represent the franchise at the All-Star Game. Hamilton entered the All-Star Break with a .346 batting average, tied for first in the AL with Miguel Cabrera.
 
On August 27, he set a Rangers record with his 24th three-hit game of the season. On September 4, Hamilton bruised his rib cage after making a leaping catch into the outfield wall. He was sidelined for almost a month and returned to play with only three games left in the regular season, hitting a home run the next day.
 
Hamilton's talent and popularity earned him a litany of nicknames including "The Hammer"; "Hambino", referencing the great Babe Ruth; "The Natural"; and "Hambone", his high school nickname tattooed on his arm.
 
Hamilton hit for a league-leading .359 average in 2010, winning his first batting title. This was the fourth-highest batting average since the end of the 2004 season. He also finished fourth in Major League Baseball in OBP (.411), first in slugging percentage (.633) and OPS (1.044), and tied for 10th in home runs (32), despite missing 29 games due to an injury. Hamilton was also one of 25 players to have 100 RBIs. His performance in 2010 made him a front-runner for the AL MVP Award. Hamilton won the AL Players Choice Award for Outstanding Player in 2010.
 
On October 22, Hamilton and the Rangers won the 2010 ALCS. It was the first time in Rangers' history they had gone to a World Series. With four home runs, seven RBIs, and the recipient of several (5) intentional walks in the ALCS win against the Yankees, he won the ALCS MVP Award. On November 23, 2010, Hamilton was voted the AL MVP.

2011
Hamilton avoided arbitration by signing a contract for two years and $24 million on February 10, 2011, with the Texas Rangers. On April 12, in Detroit, he suffered a fracture to his right humerus on a play at home plate. On May 18, Hamilton began a rehab assignment with the Double-A Frisco RoughRiders. He returned to the Rangers' lineup on May 23, and went 2–4 against Chicago White Sox pitcher John Danks, hitting his first home run of the season on the second pitch he saw during his first at-bat. He was an All-Star in 2011.
 
On July 7, during a home game at Rangers Ballpark, a 39-year-old firefighter died while catching a foul ball tossed into the stands by Hamilton. The fan, Shannon Stone, leaned over the rail to catch the ball and fell 20 feet behind the scoreboard. He was transported to a hospital, but died on the way. After learning the news after the game, Hamilton was said to be distraught. It was the third incident in which a fan fell out of the stands at Rangers Ballpark. On September 30, the son of the fallen firefighter and his mother returned to Rangers Ballpark for the first time after the incident. The son, eight-year-old Cooper Stone, threw out the ceremonial first pitch to Hamilton to start the American League Division Series. Hamilton proceeded to exchange multiple hugs with the family.
 
In 2011, Hamilton batted .298 with 25 home runs. He was third in the American League in sacrifice flies (10), sixth in intentional walks (13), and eighth in slugging percentage (.536).

2012
Hamilton hit .395 with nine home runs and 25 RBI during the month of April and was named the league's AL Player of the Month. His home run total for the month tied a franchise record for April with four other Rangers. Hamilton was considered to be in a breakout season, batting for the Triple Crown and MVP.

On May 8, in a 10–3 win over the Baltimore Orioles at Camden Yards, Hamilton registered multiple career-highs; he had five hits in five at-bats, hitting four two-run home runs and a double for a total of eight runs batted in. Incidentally, the only runner on base each time was Elvis Andrus. Hamilton was one base shy of tying the Major League record.
 
Hamilton was selected to appear in his fifth All-Star Game after accumulating the most fan votes by any player in the history of the All-Star Game selection process. José Bautista held the previous record with 7,454,753 votes in 2011 until Hamilton received 11,073,744 in 2012. The record stood until 2015, when Josh Donaldson received 14,090,188 votes.

Manager Ron Washington moved Hamilton to fifth in the batting order and designated hitter before a game with the White Sox on July 29. Since June 1, Hamilton had been hitting .190 with a slugging percentage of .374. Washington said he moved Hamilton in hopes of taking some of the pressure off him and also gave Hamilton the day off on July 28. Hamilton responded quickly—in a game on July 29, he recorded multiple walks for the first time in the month of July and did not record a strikeout for the first time in seven games. On July 30 he went 3–for–4 with a home run, his first game recording greater than two hits since May 11.

Los Angeles Angels of Anaheim (2013–2014)

On December 13, 2012, Hamilton agreed in principle to a five-year contract, worth $125 million with the Los Angeles Angels of Anaheim. This deal became official on December 15.

2013
During his first year with the Angels, Hamilton played in 151 games, batting .250 with 32 doubles, 21 home runs, and 78 RBI.

2014
During 2014, Hamilton batted .263 with 10 home runs and 44 RBIs. In the ALDS against Kansas City, Hamilton went hitless (going 0–13 overall).

2015
During February 2015, Hamilton underwent shoulder surgery to repair the AC joint. While he was recovering, it was revealed he had a relapse into his drug addiction, which he voluntarily reported to MLB. An outside arbitrator ruled Hamilton's voluntary admission did not violate baseball's drug policy, and he could not be suspended. Despite the ruling, team owner Arte Moreno made comments to the media, implying he did not want Hamilton back on the team. Furthermore, all Hamilton-related merchandise items were removed and recalled from all stores as well as an exchange program being set up. The Players Association and several Angels players spoke up in Hamilton's defense. The Angels began to lay out a rehab plan for him, but shortly afterwards, reports surfaced where the Angels were looking to trade Hamilton.

Second stint with the Texas Rangers (2015)
Hamilton was traded back to the Rangers on April 27, 2015, for cash or a player to be named later. After a short rehab stint to rehabilitate his injured shoulder between the Rangers AA and AAA Minor League affiliates, Hamilton was called up to the MLB team on May 24, and was inserted into the starting lineup on May 25 in a Memorial Day matchup in Cleveland against the Indians. He recorded his first hit back with the Rangers on May 25. On May 28 of the same year, Hamilton returned to Texas for the first time in a Rangers uniform since leaving the team after the 2012 season. He received a standing ovation from the crowd and proceeded to hit a double on the first pitch he saw. Hamilton went 2–4 in the game, driving in the only run for his own team in a 5–1 loss. On May 29, Hamilton hit two home runs in his first multi-homer game with the Rangers since 2012, leading the team to a 7–4 victory. Two days later, he hit a pinch-hit two RBI double vs. the Red Sox to win the game in walk-off fashion, 4–3. On July 30, 2015, Hamilton recorded four RBI, a home run and walk off base hit in a 7–6 Rangers' win over the New York Yankees.

In the ALDS, Hamilton's first hit was a single in Game 3. This ended his postseason hitless streak at 31 at-bats, which tied for second all time.

2016 
Hamilton began the 2016 season on the 15-day disabled list. On May 25, 2016, it was announced Hamilton would not participate for the entire 2016 season after undergoing knee surgery for the third time in nine months. The Rangers activated Hamilton from the disabled list and released him on August 23, as releasing Hamilton before September 1 would allow them to play Hamilton in the major leagues before May 15, 2017, if they chose to re-sign him.

2017 
On January 16, Texas re-signed Hamilton to a minor-league deal, with intentions of him trying out at first base.

On February 26, it was revealed Hamilton was experiencing discomfort in his left knee again, the same knee which had underwent surgery on June 8 of the previous season. Seeking an opinion with Dr. Walt Lowe, an orthopedic surgeon in Houston, it was acknowledged Hamilton would have to undergo another surgery, therefore putting his career in jeopardy. On February 27, Hamilton underwent surgery on the knee to repair torn cartilage that was causing discomfort. Recovery time required up to three months. On April 21, the Rangers released Hamilton after revealing he suffered a right knee injury while in rehabilitation for the injury of the left knee.

Career statistics
In 1,027 games over nine seasons, Hamilton posted a .290 batting average (1,134-for-3,909) with 609 runs, 234 doubles, 24 triples, 200 home runs, 701 RBI, 50 stolen bases, 352 bases on balls, .349 on-base percentage and .516 slugging percentage. Defensively, he recorded a .980 fielding percentage playing at all three outfield positions. In 42 postseason games, he hit .202 (33-for-163) with 18 runs, 9 doubles, 6 home runs, 23 RBI, 4 stolen bases and 15 walks for a .633 OPS overall.

Personal life

Family
Hamilton was married to Katie (née Chadwick), the daughter of Michael Chadwick who helped guide him in his recovery from drugs and alcohol abuse for several years. They started dating in 2002 when he returned to Raleigh, and married in 2004. In early 2015, shortly after another substance-abuse relapse, Hamilton filed for divorce from Katie after 11 years of marriage. The couple had three daughters together, along with Katie's daughter from a previous relationship.

Drug addiction and alcoholism
Hamilton's struggles with drugs and alcohol are well documented. He first stopped using drugs and alcohol after being confronted by his grandmother, Mary Holt. In May 2008, Hamilton said he had not used drugs or alcohol since October 6, 2005.
 
When giving a brief summary of his recovery, Hamilton says simply: "It's a God thing." He does not shy away from telling his story, speaking to community groups and fans at many functions. He frequently tells stories publicly of how he believes that Jesus brought him back from the brink and that faith is what keeps him going. Hamilton also wrote an autobiography called Beyond Belief which explains how he quit drugs and alcohol and found a relationship with God. His then-wife Katie sometimes accompanied him, offering her perspective on his struggles as well.
 
To comply with the provisions of MLB's drug policy, Hamilton provided urine samples for drug testing at least three times per week. Rangers' coach Johnny Narron said of the frequent testing: "I think he looks forward to the tests. He knows he's an addict. He knows he has to be accountable. He looks at those tests as a way to reassure people around him who had faith."
 
In late 2008 Hamilton, among other celebrities such as Brian Welch and Greg Ellis, appeared in testimonial videos called "I Am Second", in which he shares his story of recovering from drug use with the help of his Christian faith.
 
A portion of his return to sobriety was shown on The Learning Channel's reality show "The Real Deal". "A Home Run for Trademark" aired March 31, 2007, and chronicled the renovation of Shoeless Joe Jackson's house during 2006. Richard C. Davis, the owner of Trademark Properties, hired Hamilton as the construction foreman. Davis was negotiating the purchase of a minor league baseball team and entertaining the idea of giving Hamilton a chance to join the team.
 
Hamilton's teammates—mindful of his past struggles—chose to celebrate major events (such as winning the 2010 American League Division Series and 2010 American League Championship Series) with ginger ale instead of champagne. The Rangers repeated the celebrations with ginger ale the following postseason when they won their second consecutive pennant and reached the 2011 World Series.

Later incidents
Hamilton confirmed he suffered a relapse in early 2009 after photos were released in August 2009. Sports website Deadspin posted photos of Hamilton shirtless in a bar in Tempe, Arizona with several women. According to reports, witnesses saw Hamilton drinking, heard him asking where he could obtain cocaine, and heard him reveal his plans to go to a strip club later that evening. The photos do not show Hamilton drinking or taking any illegal drugs.
 
Prior to Hamilton's public admission, Johnny Narron said he doubted the validity of the photos, telling Deadspin, "I'm sure, in the depths of his drug addiction, he was in a lot of bars. He was in and out of bars, 'crackhouses', everything. There are probably photographs of him in all kinds of places." When responding, Narron had not seen the photos and was told they were taken during March 2009, not two months prior when the incident took place.
Although this news did not break until August 2009, Hamilton revealed he had informed his wife, the Texas Rangers, and MLB the day after the incident occurred. Hamilton called a press conference on August 8 to discuss the photos. Regarding the incident Hamilton said:
Obviously it was one of those things that reinforce that I can't have alcohol. I got away from the one thing that kept me on the straight and narrow and that was my relationship with the Lord. That should always come first. Hopefully some good will come out of this. It just crossed my mind that night, 'Can I have a drink?' Obviously I can't and this reinforces that. Since that night, I have not had another thought like that. I know it's something I shouldn't do because it leads to other things.

Hamilton also admitted he had very little memory of the night after getting drunk, and did not know about the contents of the photos. Hamilton did not see the photos after their release, but listened on the phone as his wife described them to him. After the press conference Rangers general manager Jon Daniels said, "My first reaction in January was one of concern. Since then I've talked to a lot of people and they say it was significant that he came forward immediately and was honest about it." MLB tested Hamilton for illegal drugs two days after the incident and he passed that test.
 
On February 2, 2012, it was reported Hamilton had suffered a second relapse with alcohol. He claims to have had two or three drinks before inviting his friend and then-teammate, Ian Kinsler, to talk at the bar. Hamilton held a press conference on February 3, 2012, to apologize for his actions.

In February 2015, Hamilton relapsed, using both cocaine and alcohol.

Hamilton was arrested on October 30, 2019, and charged with injury to a child, a third-degree felony, after being accused of physically assaulting his oldest daughter. On April 8, 2020, Hamilton was indicted on a felony charge for beating his daughter. If convicted, he could face up to 10 years in prison. On February 22, 2022, Hamilton was found guilty of an unlawful restraint under a plea deal, regarding a misdemeanor case that stemmed from the incident with his daughter dating back to October 2019. In the aftermath, Hamilton received a year of probation, was fined $500, and ordered to undergo 20 hours of community service along with anger management counseling and parenting rehabilitation classes. In addition, Hamilton was prohibited from possessing any weapons or substances that relate to drugs and alcohol. He was also prevented from making any contact or communication with the daughter he attacked before during the time of his probation. If he satisfies the probation requirements, the charge will be dismissed.

See also

List of Major League Baseball annual runs batted in leaders
List of Major League Baseball batting champions
Major League Baseball Most Valuable Player Award
List of Major League Baseball single-game records

References

External links

Josh Hamilton on FoxSports
Josh Hamilton Video on FoxSports Video Archive
"I'm proof that hope is never lost" from ESPN the Magazine (7/16/2007)
HELL AND BACK from ESPN the Magazine (6/21/2004)
Josh Hamilton Video on ESPN Video Archive
Triple Play Ministries of Josh and Katie Hamilton

 

1981 births
Living people
Cincinnati Reds players
Texas Rangers players
Los Angeles Angels players
Hudson Valley Renegades players
Princeton Devil Rays players
Charleston RiverDogs players
Orlando Rays players
Bakersfield Blaze players
Louisville Bats players
Oklahoma City RedHawks players
Frisco RoughRiders players
Round Rock Express players
Salt Lake Bees players
American League All-Stars
American League batting champions
American League RBI champions
Athens Drive High School alumni
Baseball players from Raleigh, North Carolina
Baseball players suspended for drug offenses
Major League Baseball outfielders
American League Most Valuable Player Award winners
American League Championship Series MVPs
Silver Slugger Award winners
American sportspeople convicted of crimes